Comibaena cassidara is a moth of the family Geometridae first described by Achille Guenée in 1857. It is found in Sri Lanka, India, Nepal, Pakistan, China, Thailand, Philippines, Malaysia, Singapore and Borneo.

It is typically a green colored moth with narrowly rufous-brown tornus of forewing and apex of hindwing. Black discal spots very small. Forewing has a faint, pale antemedial line. Caterpillar grey to brown in mottled appearance. Body has small conical spines. Long setiferous fleshy projections arise from thorax and abdomen. Pupation occurs in a loose, silken cocoon incorporating frass. The caterpillar is known to feed on Glycosmis pentaphylla, Anacardium occidentale, Mangifera indica, Cuscuta, Flemingia macrophylla, Ziziphus, Ixora, Lagerstroemia indica, Ziziphus jujuba, Ziziphus mauritiana and Acacia nilotica.

References

Moths of Asia
Moths described in 1857